Sycettaga is a genus of sponges belonging to the family Levinellidae.

The species of this genus are found in Australia.

Species:
 Sycettaga primitiva (Haeckel, 1872)

References

Clathrinida
Sponge genera